Tropiocolotes confusus is a species of gecko endemic to Oman. The type specimen was collected in Dhofar.

References

confusus
Reptiles described in 2018